An airburst round is a type of tactical anti-personnel explosive ammunition, typically a shell or grenade, that detonates in midair, causing air burst effect fragment damage to an enemy.

This makes it easier to hit enemy soldiers behind a wall, in a defensive fighting position, or in a confined space or room. It is used on many guns, from artillery to the hand-held XM25 Individual Airburst Weapon System (derived from the XM29 OICW). Unlike traditional grenades, such as the 40 mm grenade, smart grenades can be electronically programmed to explode after traveling a certain distance. A fire control computer or some other electronic sighting system is used to quickly program the electronic fuse with any distance, as conditions dictate.

Orbital ATK developed 30x173mm Mk310 PABM-T airburst rounds for Mk44 Bushmaster II.

Terminology

It is also called an airburst shell, air burst grenade, programmable ammunition, 3P ammunition or smart grenade.

List of airburst round platforms

20 mm grenade
XM29 OICW
Daewoo K11
QTS-11
25 mm grenade:
XM25 Individual Airburst Weapon System
XM307 Advanced Crew Served Weapon
Barrett XM109
30 mm
Shipunov 2A42
2A72
Mk44 Bushmaster II
Rheinmetall MK30-2/ABM
Rheinmetall Wotan 30 ABM
35 mm
PAPOP
Norinco QLU-11
Rheinmetall Wotan 35 ABM
40 mm
Bofors 40 mm gun
Mk 47 Striker
Multi Caliber Individual Weapon System
Norinco LG5
K40
40mm CTA
57 mm
AU-220M
84 mm
Carl Gustaf 8.4cm recoilless rifle
125 mm grenade
M-84AS1

External media
https://www.youtube.com/watch?v=F1dVcJXXxcY - Video showing effects of 40mm ''' programmable - airburst ammunition

References

Grenades
Ammunition